Ruizterania is a genus of flowering plants belonging to the family Vochysiaceae.

Its native range is southern Tropical America. It is found in Bolivia, Brazil, Colombia, Ecuador, French Guiana, Guyana, Peru, Suriname and Venezuela.

The genus name of Ruizterania is in honour of Luis Enrique Ruíz-Terán (1923–1979), a Venezuelan researcher and university professor of botany. 
It was first described and published in Pittieria Vol.2 on page 6 in 1969.

Known species
According to Kew:
Ruizterania albiflora 
Ruizterania belemnensis 
Ruizterania cassiquiarensis 
Ruizterania esmeraldae 
Ruizterania ferruginea 
Ruizterania gardneriana 
Ruizterania nitida 
Ruizterania obtusata 
Ruizterania retusa 
Ruizterania rigida 
Ruizterania sacculata 
Ruizterania trichanthera 
Ruizterania urceolata 
Ruizterania wittrockii

References

Vochysiaceae
Myrtales genera
Plants described in 1969
Flora of northern South America
Flora of western South America
Flora of Brazil